Federalist No. 84 is a political essay by American Founding Father Alexander Hamilton, the eighty-fourth and penultimate essay in a series known as The Federalist Papers. It was published July 16, July 26, and August 9, 1788, under the pseudonym Publius, the name under which all The Federalist Papers were published. The official title of the work is "Certain General and Miscellaneous Objections to the Constitution Considered and Answered". Federalist 84 is best known for its opposition to a Bill of Rights, a viewpoint with which the work's other author, James Madison, disagreed. Madison's position eventually won out in Congress, and a Bill of Rights was ratified on December 15, 1791.

Content
Federalist No. 84 is notable for presenting the idea that a Bill of Rights was not a necessary component of the proposed United States Constitution. The constitution, as originally written, is to specifically enumerate and protect the rights of the people. It is alleged that many Americans at the time opposed the inclusion of a bill of rights: if such a bill were created, they feared, this might later be interpreted as a list of the only rights that people had. Hamilton wrote:

Hamilton continued in this essay on defending the notion that a bill of rights is unnecessary for the constitution when he stated,
	"There remains but one other view of this matter to conclude the point. The truth is, after all the declamation we have heard, that the constitution is itself in every rational sense, and to every useful purpose, A BILL OF RIGHTS. The several bills of rights, in Great-Britain, form its constitution, and conversely, the constitution of each state is its bill of rights. And the proposed constitution, if adopted, will be the bill of rights of the union."
Ultimately, Hamilton's argument is that a bill of rights should not be added to the constitution because the entire constitution is in itself a bill of rights. Hamilton believed that the entire document, U.S. Constitution, should set limits and checks and balances on the government so that no individual's rights will be infringed upon.

See also
 Petition of Right
 Bill of Rights 1689
 Virginia Declaration of Rights

References

External links 

 Text of The Federalist No. 84: congress.gov

1788 in American law
1788 in the United States
1788 essays
84